Catocala umbrosa is a moth of the family Erebidae first described by Vernon Antoine Brou Jr. in 2002. It is found from Arizona east to New Jersey and from Florida north to Canada.

Adults are on wing from April to August. There is one generation per year.

References

External links
Oehlke, Bill. "Catocala umbrosa Brou, 2002". The Catocala Website. Retrieved October 22, 2019.

Moths described in 2002
umbrosa
Moths of North America